The Kempe Baronetcy, of Pentlow in the County of Essex, was a title in the Baronetage of England. It was created on 5 February 1627 for George Kempe. The title became extinct on his death in 1667. The head of the senior branch of the Kempe family was Spains Hall, Essex.

Kempe baronets, of Pentlow (1627)
Sir George Kempe, 1st Baronet (1602–1667)

See also
Kemp baronets

References

Extinct baronetcies in the Baronetage of England